Blabia piscoides is a species of beetle in the family Cerambycidae. It was described by Thomson in 1868. It is known from Venezuela.

References

Blabia
Beetles described in 1868